Eudendriidae is a taxonomic family of hydroids (Hydrozoa). The family contains around 85 species.

Genera
Eudendrium Ehrenberg, 1834
Myrionema Pictet, 1893

References

External links
 
Marine Biodiversity and Ecosystem Functioning

 
Filifera